Karim Bellarabi (born 8 April 1990) is a German professional footballer who plays as a winger for Bundesliga club Bayer Leverkusen and the Germany national team.

Early life
Bellarabi was born in West Berlin, to a Moroccan father and a German mother. He grew up in Bremen, where he played youth football for local clubs FC Huchting, Werder Bremen, and FC Oberneuland.

Club career
In 2008, Bellarabi joined the under-19 side of Eintracht Braunschweig. He made his senior debut for them during the 2008–09 season, followed by two more appearances during the 2009–10 league campaign. He finally became a regular starter during the 2010–11 3. Liga season and attracted notice due to his performance.

After the season, he left Braunschweig for Bundesliga side Bayer 04 Leverkusen. Due to injury, Bellarabi missed most of the 2012–13 Bundesliga season. In 2013, he returned from Leverkusen to Eintracht Braunschweig, by now playing in the Bundesliga as well, on a one-year loan deal.

Bellarabi returned to Leverkusen at the start of the 2014–15 season. On 23 August 2014, he scored the fastest goal in Bundesliga history, just in 9 seconds, on the opening match of the 2014–15 season, away to Borussia Dortmund, he led the way to a 0–2 win.

On 17 February 2017 Bellarabi scored the 50,000th goal in Bundesliga history.

In July 2018 he collapsed in a pre-season friendly.

On 13 August 2020, he extended his stay at the BayArena until 2023 amid interest from other clubs.

International career
Bellarabi has played youth international football for the German under-20 and under-21 teams. He was called up by the senior team in October 2014.

He made his senior international debut for Germany on 11 October 2014 in a 2–0 UEFA Euro 2016 qualifying defeat away to Poland, playing the full 90 minutes. On 13 June 2015, Bellarabi scored his first international goal in a 7–0 win against Gibraltar.

Career statistics

Club

International goals
Scores and results list Germany's goal tally first.

References

External links

1990 births
Living people
Footballers from Berlin
German footballers
Germany youth international footballers
Germany under-21 international footballers
FC Oberneuland players
Bayer 04 Leverkusen players
Bayer 04 Leverkusen II players
Eintracht Braunschweig players
Eintracht Braunschweig II players
Bundesliga players
3. Liga players
German people of Moroccan descent
German sportspeople of African descent
Association football wingers
Germany international footballers